The Experiment is a 2010 American drama thriller film directed by Paul T. Scheuring and starring Adrien Brody, Forest Whitaker, Cam Gigandet, Clifton Collins, Jr., and Maggie Grace, about an experiment which resembles Philip Zimbardo's Stanford prison experiment in 1971.

The film is a remake of the 2001 German film Das Experiment, which was directed by Oliver Hirschbiegel.

Plot

Volunteers arrive for a psychological study led by Dr. Archaleta (Stevens). Among the volunteers is Travis (Brody), a proud anti-war protestor, and Michael Barris (Whitaker), a 42-year-old man who still lives with his domineering mother.
After interviews measuring responses to scenes of violence, a chosen 26 are driven to an isolated prison setting with 24 hour camera coverage. The group is split into six guards and 20 prisoners, thereafter referred to only by number. Travis is assigned as a prisoner (#77), and Barris as a guard. Basic rules are outlined: prisoners must fully consume three meals a day; there will be 30 minutes of mandatory rec daily; prisoners must remain within designated areas, and cannot speak to any guard unless spoken to first. The guards must ensure prisoners obey the rules and deal commensurately with transgressions within 30 minutes. 
If the rules are broken, the guards have 30 minutes to restore order or red light will signal the end of the experiment.
Archaleta stresses that the experiment will end immediately at the first sign of violence or quitting. If all manage to follow the rules for two weeks, each man will be paid $14,000.

Travis shares his cell with Benjy, a graphic novelist, and Nix, a member of the Aryan Brotherhood who served prison time before. Barris, concerned that some of the guards may be capable of violence, tries to dissuade them from aggressive behavior. Instead, the guards grow more forceful in order to make prisoners 'obey at all costs'. Barris becomes more and more sadistic.
Realizing Travis, who grows defiant, is influencing prisoner dissent, Barris decides to humiliate him. Under Barris' lead, Travis is abducted, head shaved, and urinated upon. The red light does not come on, and Barris takes this as a sign that his actions were "commensurate". When fellow guard Bosch dissents, Barris pressures him to continue; quitting early will cause payment for everyone be forfeited.

Travis discovers that Benjy, now severely ill, concealed his need for insulin, thinking that he could manage his diabetes with just a diet. When Travis pleads for Bosche to intervene, Bosche tries to help by locating Benjy's insulin, but is caught by other guards. Barris, to Travis' surprise, puts insulin within Benjy's reach, but later has all the guards beat Bosche severely, who is then left among the prison population. Barris also orders Travis to clean the prison toilets as punishment for his defiant attitude and attempt to help Benjy. Travis taunts Barris. The guards respond by shoving Travis' head into the toilet, nearly drowning him.

One morning while being humiliated during roll call, Travis removes his prison shirt as a sign of protest and is followed by the other prisoners. Travis climbs up to one of the cameras and demands that the group be let go, but the guards choke him. When Benjy tries to defend Travis, Barris hits Benjy hard on the head, leaving the man twitching on the floor. Guards lock Travis into an old boiler pipe overnight, attack the remaining prisoners, and handcuff each man across the cell doors.

While locked in the dark boiler, Travis realizes that there is a hidden infrared camera watching him, even there.  As his despondency turns to anger, he manages to get out and interrupts Chase's attempt to rape a prisoner. The intended victim and Travis beat Chase and knock him out. They set the other prisoners free. Finding Benjy dead from his head injury, Travis leads an assault against the guards, chasing them through the building. As the rest of the guards try to lift the garage door to escape, Barris tries to keep them in, unwilling to let go of his power. A vicious brawl ensues with the prisoners overwhelming the guards by sheer numbers. Travis personally confronts Barris who tries to stab him only Travis to stop the blade with his bare hand. Shocked by his own actions, Barris does nothing as Travis beats him to a pulp.
Only then does the researcher's red light come on and the door open, signaling the end of the experiment.

The group emerges into bright sunlight, and sits on the grass in silence until a bus arrives. They are later shown on the bus, being driven home, already changed into clean clothing, and paid for their participation in the experiment.
Audio news snippets suggest that Archaleta is being tried for manslaughter in Benjy's death. Travis meets his girlfriend in India, which was his goal to enter the experiment.

Cast
 Adrien Brody as Travis Cacksmackberg 
 Forest Whitaker as Michael Barris
 Cam Gigandet as Chase
 Clifton Collins, Jr. as Nix
 Fisher Stevens as Dr. Archaleta
 Maggie Grace as Bay
 Ethan Cohn as Benjy
 Travis Fimmel as Helweg
 David Banner as Bosche
 Jason Lew as Oscar
 Damien Leake as Governor

References

External links
 
 
 

2010 films
2010 thriller drama films
2010 psychological thriller films
American thriller drama films
American remakes of German films
Films shot in Iowa
American prison films
Thriller films based on actual events
Films scored by Graeme Revell
2010 drama films
2010s English-language films
2010s American films